The 1950 Hawaii Rainbows football team represented the University of Hawaiʻi as an independent during the 1950 college football season. In their sixth season under head coach Tom Kaulukukui, the Rainbows compiled a 5–4–2 record.

Schedule

References

Hawaii
Hawaii Rainbow Warriors football seasons
Hawaii Rainbows football